Leucadendron ericifolium, the erica-leaved conebush, is a flower-bearing shrub that belongs to the genus Leucadendron and forms part of the fynbos. The plant is native to the Western Cape, South Africa.

Description
The plant blooms in July with the fruit ripening in November.

The tree's national number is 80.

Distribution and habitat
The plant is found in the Outeniqua Mountains, among others.

References

http://redlist.sanbi.org/species.php?species=794-46
http://biodiversityexplorer.info/plants/proteaceae/leucadendron_ericifolium.htm
https://www.proteaatlas.org.za/Protea_Atlas_Leucadendron2.pdf

ericifolium